This is a list of gold mines in the U.S. state of Georgia, all of which are inactive. Most of the mines were discovered in the late 1820s and 1830s during the Georgia Gold Rush, and make up what is known as the Georgia Gold Belt.

References

Pine Mountain Gold Museum at Stockmar Park

Gold mines by Georgia's County are listed in "Geology of the Greater Atlanta Region," Bulletin 96, Georgia Geological Survey, Atlanta, 1984, Keith I. McConnell and Charlotte E. Abrams. Approximately 135 mines are listed.

Gold mines by Georgia's County are also listed in "A Preliminary Report on a Part of the Gold Deposits of Georgia,"1896

Gold
Gold
Georgia